Hardik Bhatt (born 17 April 1997) is an Indian professional footballer, who plays as a right back for Indian Super League club Mumbai City on a loan from Rajasthan United.

Career

Bhatt started his career with ARA. In 2019, he signed for Bengaluru United. In 2023, he signed for Mumbai City.

Honours 

Mumbai City
Indian Super League (Premiership): 2022–23

References 

Living people
1997 births
Indian footballers
Association football defenders
Mumbai City FC players